Ronald Melville may refer to:
 Ronald Melville (botanist)
 Ronald Melville (civil servant)